The Boston Bruins, a professional ice hockey team based in Boston, Massachusetts, has had 27 head coaches in its team history. The franchise is a member of the Atlantic Division of the Eastern Conference of the National Hockey League (NHL). The franchise was founded in 1924 and entered the NHL as the first American-based expansion team, playing its initial seasons at the still-active Boston Arena. It is an Original Six team, along with the Toronto Maple Leafs, Detroit Red Wings, New York Rangers, Montreal Canadiens and Chicago Blackhawks. Its home arena is the 17,565-person capacity TD Garden, where it has played since 1995, after leaving the Boston Garden.

Art Ross served three terms as the Bruins head coach. Ross, Lynn Patrick, and Milt Schmidt have all been inducted to the Hockey Hall of Fame. Harry Sinden, Gerry Cheevers, Tom Johnson and Frank Patrick are Hockey Hall of Fame inductees, and spent their entire coaching careers with the Bruins. Cooney Weiland, Dit Clapper, Terry O'Reilly, Steve Kasper and Mike O'Connell also coached only for the Bruins, with Mike Sullivan taking over as head coach for the Pittsburgh Penguins on December 12, 2015.

Statistically, Tom Johnson was the most successful head coach, with a winning percentage of .738. He is followed by Harry Sinden, who, averaging his two terms, had a winning percentage of .689. The worst head coach statistically was Phil Watson, who, with a winning percentage of .268, only won 16 out of the 84 games he coached. Claude Julien took over after Dave Lewis was dismissed in 2007. Bruce Cassidy succeeded Julien on February 7, 2017, and served as head coach until his firing on June 6, 2022.

Key

Coaches

Notes
 A running total of the number of coaches of the Bruins. Thus any coach who has two or more separate terms as head coach is only counted once.

References
General

Specific

 
Boston Bruins head coaches
head coaches